"It's All Up to You" is a song by British singer-songwriter Jim Capaldi. It was released as a single in 1974, and became his first of only two hit singles in his native UK, peaking at No. 27. His other UK hit is the No. 4 cover of the Everly Brothers song, "Love Hurts", released the following year. Both songs appear on his 1975 album, Short Cut Draw Blood.

Track listing
UK 7" single
A. "It's All Up to You"
B. "Whale Meat Again"

Musicians
 Jim Capaldi - drums, vocals, percussion
 Jess Roden - guitar
 John "Rabbit" Bundrick - piano, clavinet
 Phil Chen - bass
 Harry Robinson - string arrangement

References

1974 songs
1974 singles
Jim Capaldi songs
Songs written by Jim Capaldi
Island Records singles